Beverly "Bev" Buckway (born 1954 in Whitehorse, Yukon) is a Canadian former politician, who served as mayor of Whitehorse, Yukon, from 2006 to 2012.

Buckway was first elected to Whitehorse City Council in 2003. During her terms on council, she served as president of the Association of Yukon Communities for two terms, and as an executive member of the Federation of Canadian Municipalities. She was a task force member for the Review of Yukon's Police Force that resulted in the Sharing Common Ground report. In 2012, Buckway received the Queen Elizabeth II Diamond Jubilee Medal for her municipal contributions.

Buckway is a past president of Rotary International and a Paul Harris Fellow. As a former curler, Buckway represented the Yukon at the Scott Tournament of Hearts and as a former volleyball player at the Arctic Winter Games and the Canada Winter Games.

References 

1954 births
Canadian sportsperson-politicians
Mayors of Whitehorse
Women mayors of places in Yukon
Curlers from Yukon
Living people
Canadian women curlers
Sportspeople from Whitehorse
Canadian women's volleyball players
Women municipal councillors in Canada
21st-century Canadian women politicians